{{Infobox television
| native_name        =
| image              = Tehran TV poster.jpg
| caption            = Tehrans first season international poster. Azadi Tower as background.
| genre              = 
| based_on           = 
| creator            = 
| starring           = 
| writer             = 
| director           = Daniel Syrkin
| composer           = Mark Eliyahu
| country            = Israel
| distributor        = 
| language           = 
| num_seasons        = 2
| num_episodes       = 16
| list_episodes      = 
| executive_producer = 
| producer           = 
| editor             = 
| cinematography     = Giora Bejach
| camera             = 
| runtime            = 
| company            = 
| network            = Kan 11
| picture_format     = 
| first_aired        = 
| last_aired         = present
}}Tehran is an Israeli spy thriller television series created by Moshe Zonder for the Israeli public channel Kan 11. Written by Zonder and Omri Shenhar and directed by Daniel Syrkin, the series premiered in Israel on June 22, 2020 and September 25 internationally on Apple TV+.

Featuring dialogue in Hebrew, Persian and English, the series follows an Iranian-Jewish Mossad agent on her first mission in Iran's capital, which is also the place of her birth.

On January 26, 2021, it was announced that the series had been renewed by Apple TV+ for a second season. On June 22, 2021, it was announced that Glenn Close had joined the cast. The second season was released on May 6, 2022. On February 8, 2023, it was announced that the series had been renewed by Apple TV+ for a third season, with Hugh Laurie joining the cast.

At the International Emmy Awards ceremony held in November 2021, Tehran received the award for best drama series, becoming the first ever Israeli series to win this award.

Plot
 Season 1 

Protagonist Tamar Rabinyan, a young Jewish woman born in Iran but raised in Israel, is a Mossad agent and computer hacker on an undercover mission in the Iranian capital to disable a nuclear reactor. Her objective is neutralizing Iranian air defenses so that the Israeli Air Force can bomb a nuclear plant and prevent Iran from obtaining an atomic bomb. When she arrives in Iran she switches identities with Zhila Gorbanifar, a Muslim employee of the local electric company. In Zhila's place she enters the electric company station and connects to the computer network. Then she tries to cut electric power to the Iranian radar system, in order to facilitate an ongoing Israeli Air Force attack. Her mission fails because her boss, who thinks she is Zhila, tries to rape her and is killed in a fight that ensues. After escaping, Tamar has to go into hiding. Being born in Iran and having moved to Israel when she was six, Tamar now discovers her local roots, goes to see her aunt, and befriends Iranian pro-democracy activists. Meanwhile, she is hunted by Faraz Kamali, head of investigations of the Revolutionary Guards.

 Season 2 

Prior to being smuggled out of Iran to start a new life in Canada, Tamar accepts a mission to rescue one of the Israeli pilots captured after the reactor mission. At the hospital where the pilot is being held, she encounters Marjan Montazami, a psychotherapist and local agent for Mossad, who aids in her escape. Tamar's aunt is executed for assisting her, and a devastated Tamar agrees to stay in Tehran with Milad to undertake a new mission: the assassination of Qasem Mohammadi who has been promoted to head of the Revolutionary Guard. Tamar works to gain access to Mohammadi by getting close to his son, Peyman. Faraz Kamali continues his relentless pursuit of Tamar, but finds himself compromised as Marjan begins working as a psychotherapist for his wife following her abduction and release by Mossad. In spite of Faraz's reluctant assistance, Tamar's attempt to poison Mohammadi fails, as does an attempt to kill him with a booby-trapped phone. Mossad head Yulia Magen calls off the mission, but Tamar and Milad try to take control of Mohammadi's sports car as he races against his son, which only results in Peyman's death. Marjan is poisoned by Nahid, Faraz's wife. Tamar manages to kill Mohammadi with the explosive mobile phone. Milad is killed by a car bomb planted by the Mossad in the escape car, leaving Tamar alone and trapped in Iran with no-one to trust.

Cast
Main
 Niv Sultan as Tamar Rabinyan, a young Jewish woman born in Iran but raised in Israel, a Mossad agent and computer hacker
 Shaun Toub as Faraz Kamali, head of investigations of the Islamic Revolutionary Guard Corps
 Shervin Alenabi as Milad, Tamar's boyfriend (seasons 1-2)
 Menashe Noy as Meir Gorev (season 1)
 Liraz Charhi as Yael Kadosh (season 1)
 Shila Ommi as Nahid, wife of Faraz Kamali (season 2; recurring season 1)
 Darius Homayoun as Peyman Mohammadi, son of Qasem and Fatemeh Mohammadi (season 2)
 Glenn Close as Marjan Montazami, a British agent in Tehran (season 2)

Special guest stars
 Navid Negahban as Masoud Tabrizi (season 1)

Recurring
 Esti Yerushalmi as Arezoo, mother of Raziyeh Nekumard (seasons 1-2)
 Arash Marandi as Ali, an Islamic Revolutionary Guard Corps agent (seasons 1-2)
 Vassilis Koukalani as Sardar Qasem Mohammadi, head of Islamic Revolutionary Guard Corps (seasons 1-2)
 Danny Sher as Mike (season 1)
 Moe Bar-El as Karim (season 1)
 Ash Goldeh as Hassan (season 1)
 Nati Navid Toobian as Dariush, father of Raziyeh Nekumard (seasons 1-2)
 Reza Brojerdi as Farham Kasrai (season 1)
 Alex Naki as Mordechai Rabinyan, Tamar's father (season 1)
 Qais Khan as Mohammed Balochi (season 1)
 Sogand Sara Fakheri as Raziyeh Nekumard (seasons 1-2)
 Reza Diako as Shahin (season 2 special appearance; season 1)
 Dan Mor as Eran (season 1)
 Sara von Schwarze as Yulia Magen (season 2)
 Sia Alipour as Vahid Nemati (season 2)
 Behi Djanti Atai as Fatemeh Mohammadi, wife of Qasem Mohammadi and mother of Peyman Mohammadi (season 2)
 Bijan Daneshmand as Dr. Kourosh Zamestani head of the hospital (season 2)

 Episodes 

Season 1 (2020)

Season 2 (2022)

Production and distribution

Production
Production began on October 28, 2019. Some of the actors playing Iranians were born in Iran, and speak the language as their mother tongue. Niv Sultan, who plays Tamar, studied Persian for four months. In addition, she studied Krav Maga, an Israeli self-defence system. The series was shot entirely on location in Athens. Filming for Season 2 began in August 2021.

International distribution
Originally the series aired on Kan 11 in Israel and is available for streaming on the Kan 11 website in Hebrew. In July 2019, Cineflix acquired exclusive global distribution rights for the series. On June 16, 2020, Apple TV+ bought international rights to the series outside of Israel, and will serve as the exclusive streaming home to the series worldwide. 

The show's distributors claim that the series was popular with audiences in India, Japan and Singapore.

In September 2020, it was announced that Moshe Zonder, the series co-creator, had inked a first-look deal with Apple. In October 2020, Niv Sultan signed with WME.

Season 2
Rumors about a possible second season of Tehran began on September 10, 2020, when it was announced that co-creator Moshe Zonder signed a multi-year "first look" deal to create projects for Apple TV+.

In December 2020, executive producer Julien Leroux said that production had begun on a second season though it had not been officially approved. Almost two months later, on January 26, 2021, Apple TV+ confirmed that the series had been renewed for the second season.

Season 2 was released on May 6, 2022, as per confirmed reports with the first two episodes released that day and later episodes on a weekly basis.

ReceptionTehran has received positive reviews from critics. On Rotten Tomatoes, season one holds a rating of 94% based on 18 reviews, with an average rating of 7.3/10. The site's critical consensus reads, "Tehrans expertly plotted twists further elevate a geopolitical thriller deftly balanced between the global and the personal." On Metacritic, the show has a score of 72 out of 100, based on 6 critics, indicating "generally favorable reviews".

References

External links
 Tehran on Kan 11 website (he), including stream of all aired episodes
 Tehran at Apple TV+
 
 
 

2020 Israeli television series debuts
Hebrew-language television shows
Espionage television series
Israeli thriller television series
Apple TV+ original programming
Kan 11 original programming
Television shows set in Iran
Television shows filmed in Greece
Works about the Mossad
Mass media about the Iran–Israel proxy conflict
Tehran in fiction
International Emmy Award for Best Drama Series winners